The Thicket is an mystery/suspense novel written by American author Joe R. Lansdale.  It was released by Mulholland Books on September 10, 2013. The title refers to Big Thicket, a heavily forested area in Southeast Texas. This book was selected by the Library Journal as one of the best historical fiction books of 2013. The trade paperback was issued on 10/14/14 by Mulholland Books.

Premise
Jack Parker thought he'd already seen his fair share of tragedy. His grandmother was killed in a farm accident when he was barely five years old. His parents have just succumbed to the smallpox epidemic sweeping turn-of-the-century East Texas—orphaning him and his younger sister, Lula.

Then a travelling group of bank robbers murder Jack's grandfather and kidnap his sister Lula. So Jack enlists the only people he can: a bounty hunting dwarf named Shorty, a grave-digging son of an ex-slave named Eustace, and a street-smart woman-for-hire named Jimmie Sue who's come into some very intimate knowledge about the bandits. Together the rag-tag group trail the group of criminals into the Big Thicket where they hope to rescue Lula and collect the bounty on the heads of the bandits. Soon they discover these are not your run of the mill bank robbers. They are vicious and sadistic killers and the prospect of rescuing Lula unharmed looks bleak.

Film adaptation

In 2014, it was announced that Gianni Nunnari was set to produce a film adaptation of with Peter Dinklage set to star as Shorty.

In April 2019, Elliott Lester signed on to direct the film with Chris Kelley writing the screenplay.

In February 2020, Sophia Lillis, Noomi Rapace & Charlie Plummer joined the cast.

In March 2023, Juliette Lewis, Esmé Creed-Miles, Levon Hawke, Leslie Grace, Gbenga Akinnagbe,  Macon Blair, James Hetfield, Ned Dennehy, Andrew Schulz, and Arliss Howard joined the cast with Lewis, Hawke, and Creed-Miles replacing Rapace, Plummer, and Lillis, respectively.

References

External links
Author's official website
Mulhollond Books website
Interview with Joe Lansdale about The Thicket

Novels by Joe R. Lansdale
Novels set in Texas
Western (genre) novels
American mystery novels
2013 American novels
Works by Joe R. Lansdale
American historical novels
Mulholland Books books